Reminiscences: With the Century is the autobiography of Kim Il-sung, founder and former president of North Korea. The memoirs, written in 1992 and published in eight volumes, retell Kim's life story through his childhood to the time of Korean resistance. Initially, a total of 30 volumes were planned but Kim Il-sung died in 1994 after just six volumes; the seventh and eight volumes were published posthumously. The work reveals early influences of religious and literary ideas on Kim's thinking. An important part of North Korean literature, With the Century is held as a valuable if somewhat unreliable insight into the nation's modern history under late colonial Korea. The book is considered one of a few North Korean primary sources widely available in the West and as notable research material for North Korean studies.

Authorship of With the Century is disputed, with some claiming that it was written by professional writers instead of Kim Il-sung himself.

History
Up until the 1960s, Kim Il-sung had encouraged his fellow revolutionaries to publish their memoirs, and generals such as Eulji Mundeok, Gang Gam-chan and Yi Sun-sin were featured in North Korean history books. Kim Il-sung's son and future successor Kim Jong-il, however, called back such biographies and sought to reinforce Kim Il-sung's cult of personality by controlling the works that made reference to him. In this regard, With the Century effectively replaced another work, Reminiscences of the Anti-Japanese Guerillas, as one of the most important propaganda pieces.

In 1974, Kim announced that he would write his memoirs. According to Kim himself, before that he had spared little thought about writing his memoirs. When Kim Jong-il assumed the office of Secretary for Organizational Affairs, Kim Il-sung was allowed more time to focus on his writing. Kim also describes being encouraged to write his memoirs by literary people and foreign statesmen. With the Century was written in 1992 when Kim was in his 80s, two years prior to his death. Initially the memoirs were supposed to span 90 chapters in 30 volumes comprising five parts: "The Anti-Japanese Revolution", "People's Country", "Along the Road of Socialism", "The Nation's Desire", and "Turning Point of Century". However, only the first six volumes of part one, "The Anti-Japanese Revolution", were completed before Kim's death and two additional volumes were published posthumously.

Kim Il-sung's ideological influences
The memoirs suggest that Kim Il-sung was influenced by communism, Christianity, Confucianism, Cheondoism and wide range of other traditions. Kim Il-sung was born to a Presbyterian family, even though he downplays their devotion in his memoirs. The anti-foreign pro-independence Donghak Movement, founded by a Korean scholar Choe Je-u and influenced by Catholic missionaries, is one of the fascinations of his youth that Kim Il-sung treats at length in the memoirs. The Donghak rebellion served as a model for other contemporary Korean movements combining religion with nationalism. Kim Il-sung describes being intrigued by the native Korean Cheondoism movement that evolved from the Donghak rebellion. Cheondoism believes in the idea that all men are equal and bear the spirit of heaven in themselves.

The memoirs disclose that the Chinese author and Communist Party member Sang Wol (Shang Yue) was Kim Il-sung's teacher in literary matters at private Yuwen Middle School in 1928, where Sang Wol taught for six months. This was young Kim's most decisive and the only formal educational influence on his background with both literature and esthetics. Sang Wol introduced Kim Il-sung to the classics of Chinese, and Russian literature such as Maxim Gorky's Mother and Enemies. Sang Wol encouraged Kim to become a 'proletarian writer'. Outside of school, Kim Il-sung also came into contact with Joseph Stalin's writings.

The memoirs reveal the impact of Kim Il-sung's knowledge of religion and scholarship of literary classics and art on the theory of Juche. Juche ideology has been interpreted as being similar to Cheondoism, as both think that people are the masters of their own fates. Despite the various early religious influences, Kim Il-sung frowned upon the practice of religion, and instead demanded near-religious loyalty and adherence to the militaristic rules that are part of living in North Korea. In the preface of With the Century, Kim writes: The people are my God' has been my constant view and motto. The principle of Juche, which calls for drawing on the strength of the masses who are the masters of the revolution and construction, is my political creed."

Volumes

Reception

The well-liked With the Century holds an important role in North Korean culture and society. Domestically, it is a major source of the myth of the "anti-Japanese" struggle in propaganda. Western scholars, on the other hand, have focused on the historicity of events portrayed in the memoirs and have critically assessed the value of With the Century as a historical source. The omnipresence of With the Century has also been linked to Kim's cult of personality. The book is banned in South Korea for the general public similarly to other printed material originating from North Korea. In August 2011, the South Korean Supreme Court regarded With the Century as “anti-state expression” under the National Security Law.

Popularity in North Korea
Despite its political nature and conformity with the official political line of the state, With the Century enjoys genuine popularity in North Korea. It is considered Kim Il-sung's most popular work, and when the first volume was released, it supposedly became an instant hit. As a child, defector Jae-young Kim remembers reading "every page with fascination, despite the highly ideological subject matter" and being particularly intrigued with stories about Kim Il-sung's first wife, Kim Jong-suk. Defector and former propagandist, Jang Jin-sung recalls in his book Dear Leader: My Escape from North Korea how when he wants to impress a fellow escapee, he brags that his friend's "grandparents are mentioned in our textbooks as leading anti-Japanese resistance fighters, as well as in Kim Il-sung's own memoir, With the Century." According to Hwang Jang-yop, a high-ranking North Korean defector, the book's contents were as if they were straight out of revolutionary movies making it a very pleasant read.

The work typifies the attitude of North Korean propaganda toward military affairs. Military decisions are not based on strategy and reason but emotional conviction to a cause.

Western commentary on historicity and authorship

With the Century is one of the few North Korean primary sources widely available in the West, and is therefore considered an important source for scholars of North Korean studies. However, the accuracy of the portrayal of historical events in the book has been questioned by scholars. According to Fyodor Tertitskiy, With the Century compromises accuracy and molds events to support the view point of North Korean ideology. For instance, the autobiography recounts the official version of the birth of Kim's son, Kim Jong-il, on Mount Paektu, widely discredited in the West. Hwang Jang-yop calls With the Century a "masterpiece of historical fabrication". Others like Bradley K. Martin note that With the Century is more truthful about Kim's life than official sources published before the 1990s. While it is impossible to verify his writings on his early childhood, Kim's account of events in his youth during the resistance are often more believable than his contemporaries'. For instance, Kim's association with the Church in his childhood is not denied, and neither is the fact that he joined the foreign Communist Party of China in 1931.

According to Hwang Jang-yop, With the Century was not written by Kim Il-sung himself but was composed by professional writers and journalists. These writers were supposedly revolutionary film authors, tasked with giving the work movie-like scenes. According to Jang Jin-sung, the authors were novelists of the April 15 Literary Production Group, a "First class" institution reserved to serve the Kim family (Jang also claimed that in 1993, Kim allegedly told a group of Chongryon members how much he enjoyed reading With the Century), while Hwang attributes the writing to the staff of the Party History Center. The production of the memoirs may have been supervised by Kim Jong-il. Hwang, who held a top position in the party at that time, was opposed to publishing the posthumous volumes as he thought that the ones published so far were "too intriguing to be true". Hwang also opposed rewriting post-liberation history because later events would be easier to verify, and historical revisionism could anger North Korea's diplomatic allies.

Release details
The first six volumes of With the Century were published before Kim's death in 1994. The seventh and eight volumes were published posthumously. The volumes have been reprinted as part of at least two collections: the 50-volume Kim Il-Sung: Works and the 100-volume Complete Collection of Kim Il Sung's Works. The volumes are also included with the North Korean made tablet computer Samjiyon. In addition to the full eight volumes, the electronic library on the tablet includes the 50-volume Works which holds the first 18 chapters of With the Century.

Translations exist in 20 languages, including Chinese, Japanese, English, French, Spanish, Russian, German and Arabic.

In April 2021, the memoirs were published by a publisher in South Korea, causing great controversy. On 23 April 2021, Kyobo Book Center, South Korea's biggest bookstore chain, decided to cease sales of the memoirs, in order to "protect customers". Several conservative organizations, such as New Paradigm of Korea, sought an injunction to ban the sales of With the Century, because "distribution of the memoirs 'glamorizing the Kim family' infringes on human rights and harms the dignity of South Koreans as well as the country's democracy." The junction was rejected by the Seoul Western District Court on 16 May 2021. The court said that the memoirs did not directly involve the plaintiffs, so their rights have not been violated by the book's content. On 26 May 2021, South Korea police raided the office of the publisher Minjok Sarangbang, confiscated materials as evidence, as the publication of the memoirs allegedly violated the National Security Act.

See also

Korean nationalist historiography
Kim Il-sung bibliography
Kim Jong-il bibliography
Paek Son-haeng

References

Citations

Sources

External links
 Full text of With the Century at Publications of the DPRK
 Audiovisual excerpts at Voice of Korea
  
 Thematical quotations in 
 Indexes at the Marxists Internet Archive

1992 non-fiction books
Authorship debates
Works by Kim Il-sung
Korean non-fiction books
Multi-volume biographies
North Korean books
Political memoirs